George Carter (20 August 1908 – 10 July 1982) was an English cricketer. He played four first-class matches for Bengal between 1937 and 1939.

See also
 List of Bengal cricketers

References

External links
 

1908 births
1982 deaths
English cricketers
Bengal cricketers
People from Brentford